Jinjiazhuang District is a former district of the city of Ma'anshan, Anhui Province, China. On 10 September 2012, it was merged into Ma'anshan's Huashan District.

References

External links

Ma'anshan
Former districts of China